Mahaveer Bhagora (17 April 1947 – 16 January 2021) was an Indian politician who was a member of the 14th Lok Sabha of India. He represented the Salumber constituency of Rajasthan from 2004 to 2009 and was a member of the Bharatiya Janata Party (BJP) political party. He is a Christian by faith and his burial had sparked a debate in BJP circles.

Bhagora died of COVID-19 during the COVID-19 pandemic in India.

Bribe for Vote
On 22 July, during trust vote debate three BJP MPs, Bhagora displayed a bag full of one crore Indian rupee notes with an allegation that the same was given to them by UPA allies to vote in their favor.

References

External links
 Official biographical sketch in Parliament of India website

1947 births
2021 deaths
Bharatiya Janata Party politicians from Rajasthan
India MPs 2004–2009
Lok Sabha members from Rajasthan
People from Udaipur district
Politicians from Udaipur
Deaths from the COVID-19 pandemic in India